The 2022 Skyrunning World Championships was 7th edition Skyrunning World Championships and took place in Ossola, Italy from 9–11 September 2022. The main town of the area, where the teams will be based, was Domodossola

Program

Medalists

Medal table

Participating nations 
A record 35 countries participated in the 2022 Skyrunning World Championships. Nine countries participated for the first time: Belgium, Germany, Ireland, Israel, Kosovo, Montenegro, Romania, Slovenia and South Africa.

References

External links 
International Skyrunning Federation

Skyrunning World Championships
Skyrunning
Skyrunning